Mars 4, also known as 3MS No.52S was a Soviet spacecraft intended to explore Mars. A 3MS spacecraft launched as part of the Mars programme, it was intended to enter orbit around Mars in 1974. However, computer problems prevented orbital insertion from occurring.

Spacecraft 
The Mars 4 spacecraft carried an array of instruments to study Mars. In addition to cameras, it was equipped with a radio telescope, an IR radiometer, multiple photometers, polarimeters, a magnetometer, plasma traps, an electrostatic analyzer, a gamma-ray spectrometer, and a radio probe.

Built by Lavochkin, Mars 4 was the first of two 3MS spacecraft launched to Mars in 1973, being followed by Mars 5. A 3MS was also launched during the 1971 launch window as Kosmos 419. However, due to a launch failure, it failed to depart Earth orbit. In addition to the orbiters, two 3MP lander missions, Mars 6 and Mars 7, were launched during the 1973 window.

Launch 
Mars 4 was launched by a Proton-K carrier rocket, a Blok D upper stage, flying from Baikonur Cosmodrome Site 81/23. The launch occurred at 19:30:59 UTC on 21 July 1973, with the first three stages placing the spacecraft and upper stage into a low Earth parking orbit before the Blok D fired to propel Mars 4 into heliocentric orbit bound for Mars.

Shortly after performing a course correction on 30 July 1973, two onboard computers failed, leaving Mars 4 unable to perform maneuvers. As a result of this, it was unable to enter orbit around Mars.

Scientific Instruments 
Mars 4 orbiter carried 15 scientific instruments on board to study Mars from orbital trajectory

 Atmospheric Radio-probing Instrument
 Radio Telescope
 Infrared Radiometer
 Spectrophotometer
 Narrow-band Photometer
 Narrow-band Interference-Polarization Photometer
 Imaging System
 Photometers
 Two Polarimeters
 Ultraviolet Photometer
 Scattered Solar Radiation Photometer
 Gamma Spectrometer
 Magnetometer
 Plasma Traps
 Multichannel Electrostatic Analyzer

See also
 List of missions to Mars
 Timeline of artificial satellites and space probes

References 

1973 in the Soviet Union
Spacecraft launched in 1973
1973 in spaceflight
Mars program
Derelict satellites in heliocentric orbit
4MV
Non Earth orbiting satellites of the Soviet Union